Richard Moran may refer to:

 Richard Moran (Australian footballer) (1887–1940), Australian rules footballer
 Richard Moran (author) (born 1950), American venture capitalist and author
 Richard Moran (camera operator), Australian camera operator
 Richard Moran (canoeist) (born 1932), American Olympic canoer
 Richard Moran (philosopher), philosopher who works at Harvard University
 Richard Allen Moran (1954–1996), American convicted murderer

See also
 Rich Moran (born 1962), American football guard
 Richie Moran (footballer) (born 1963), British footballer, writer and anti-racism campaigner
 Richie Moran (lacrosse) (1937–2022), American lacrosse player and coach